Malik Zinad (born 19 November 1993) is a Libyan professional boxer who has held the WBC Mediterranean light heavyweight title since August 2021.

Early life
Zinad was born on 19 November 1993 in Tripoli, Libya. His father, a former boxer himself, began training him in the sport when he was five, though they practised in the basement of their home due to Muammar Gaddafi's ban on boxing. However, Zinad left his country in 2013 due to the unrest following Gaddafi's death, eventually settling in the island nation of Malta after his father encouraged him to follow his dreams.

Zinad had about 25 bouts in his amateur career, eight of which took place in Malta.

Professional career
Zinad made his professional debut on 30 October 2015, defeating Bogoljub Borišev via second-round technical knockout (TKO) in Attard, Malta. After signing former world champion Donny Lalonde as his manager, he captured the vacant WBF International light heavyweight title in his sixth fight, stopping Attila Palko on 24 September 2016. He defended the belt three months later, knocking out Beka Aduashvili in the German town of Bielefeld to retain. Zinad won the  light heavyweight title on 25 March 2017, stopping Bosnian journeyman Aleksandar Kuvac in just over a minute. He then upset Jermaine Asare two months later, knocking him out in the first round of their fight at the Motorpoint Arena in Cardiff. Zinad made his London debut on 12 October 2019, dominating Michal Gazdik in two rounds at York Hall.

After compiling a 16–0 record, Zinad beat Russian prospect Timur Nikarkhoev in Brussels on 28 March 2021 to collect the vacant IBO Inter-Continental light heavyweight title. In his next fight that August, he scored a third-round TKO over Almir Škrijelj for the vacant WBC Mediterranean light heavyweight title.

Professional boxing record

Notes

References

External links
 
 

Living people
1993 births
Libyan male boxers
Light-heavyweight boxers
People from Tripoli, Libya